Bathysquillidae is a family of mantis shrimp. It contains two genera and three species. The family was described by Raymond Manning in 1967.

Characteristics
Mantis shrimps in this family can be distinguished by the fact that the dorsal surface is rough and covered in tubercles, the exopod (outer branch) of the uropod (fan-like sixth abdominal segment appendage) is fully articulated and the telson (terminal segment) is wider than it is long. The fifth abdominal segment bears no posteriorly directed median spine.

Genera and species
According to the World Register of Marine Species, the family includes the following genera and species:

 Genus Altosquilla 
 Altosquilla soelae 
 Genus Bathysquilla 
 Bathysquilla crassispinosa 
 Bathysquilla microps

References

Stomatopoda
Crustacean families